Nicosia within the city limits is divided into 29 administrative units, according to the latest census. This unit is termed in English as quarter, neighbourhood, parish,  or mahalla. These units are: Ayios Andreas (former name: Tophane), Trypiotis, Nebethane, Tabakhane, Phaneromeni, Ayios Savvas, Omerie, Ayios Antonios (St. Anthony), St. John, Taht-el-kale, Chrysaliniotissa, Ayios Kassianos (Kafesli), Kaïmakli, Panayia, St Constantine & Helen, Ayioi Omoloyites, Arab Ahmet, Yeni Jami, Omorfita, Ibrahim Pasha, Mahmut Pasha, Abu Kavouk, St. Luke, Abdi Chavush, Iplik Pazar and Korkut Effendi, Ayia Sophia, Haydar Pasha, Karamanzade, and Yenişehir/Neapolis (separated from Ibrahim Pasha 25 January 2010). Some of  these units were previously independent Communities (village authorities). Ayioi Omoloyites was annexed in 1944, while Kaïmakli and Omorfita were annexed in 1968. Pallouriotissa, also annexed in 1968, was subsequently divided into the neighbourhoods of Panayia, and St Constantine & Helen.

The municipality of Strovolos, established in 1986, is the second largest municipal authority in Cyprus in terms of population after Limassol and encompasses the southern suburbs of the capital immediately adjacent to Nicosia municipality. Strovolos is divided into six parishes: Chryseleousa, Ayios Demetrios, Apostle Barnabas and Ayios Makarios, Ayios Vasilios, Kyprianos and Stavros.

Beyond Strovolos on the south-western fringes of the metropolis lies the municipality of Lakatamia, created in 1986 out of the two Communities (village authorities) of Lower Lakatamia and Upper Lakatamia. After being declared a municipality Lakatamia was, for administrative purposes, divided into the following four parishes:
Ayia Paraskevis,
St. Nicholas,
Ayios Mamas,
Archangel-Anthoupolis.
Contrary to other Municipalities, Lakatamia Municipality has its own water supply (Lakatamia Water Board). It has jurisdiction over the water supply and sees to the construction, maintenance and functioning of water supply systems within its boundaries.

South of Strovolos lies the municipality of Latsia, established in 1986.
Latsia is divided into three parishes: St. George (covering most of the area of Latsia), Ayios Eleftherios (covering the Ayios Eleftherios refugee housing estate) and Archangel Michael (covering the refugee self-housing estate of that name).

East of Latsia lies Yeri, which became a municipality in 2011. The built up area of Yeri just touches Latsia near their mutual boundary and thus the new municipality is conurbated with Nicosia.

The municipality of Aglandjia, established in 1986, encompasses the south-eastern suburbs of the capital immediately adjacent to Nicosia municipality. The Nicosia-Limassol highway forms the boundary with Strovolos to the west. The name of the municipality has various spellings, but derives from the Turkish word 'Eğlence - Entertainment'. The older English spelling is Eylenja.

The western suburbs are encompassed in the municipalities of Ayios Dometios and Engomi, both established in 1986. The municipality of Ayios Dometios is divided into the parishes of St. George and St. Paul.

The town of Gönyeli is now conurbated with the northern suburbs. Previously a village authority, it now functions as a municipality within the same area Gönyeli is divided into the Neighbourhoods of Baraj (barrage), Çarşı, Baz and Yeni Kent (new town).

The suburbs immediately to the north of the city have not been erected into municipalities. The village authority of Hamitköy (also known as Hamid Mandres) was heavily urbanized and continued to exist until 1 September 2008, when it was included within the borders of Nicosia Turkish Municipality as a Nicosia neighbourhood headed by a muhtar.

Ortakeuy Village authority has similarly been redefined as a neighbourhood of Nicosia Turkish Municipality.

After the invasion the Greek Cypriot inhabitants of Mia Milia were displaced to other parts of Cyprus and the area was resettled by displaced Turkish Cypriots from other areas. The Mia Milia Village Council of the Republic of Cyprus continues to operate in exile, but the Nicosia Turkish Municipality considers it one of its neighbourhoods.

The ethnically mixed Village of Trakhonas has suffered several displacements of both its Greek and Turkish Cypriot inhabitants since the 1960s and since the invasion has been heavily urbanised. It does not currently function as a local government unit

The settlement of Anthoupolis is an enclave created within Lakatamia after the invasion of 1974 and is directly administered by the government and not the municipality within which it is situated.

References 

Nicosia
Subdivisions of Cyprus